Abeokuta North is a Local Government Area in Ogun State, Nigeria. Its headquarters are in the town of Akomoje, near Abeokuta.
It has an area of 808 km and a population of 201,329 at the 2006 census.

The local government area includes the Oyan Dam, an important source of water to the cities of Lagos and Abeokuta.
Communities who rely on the Oyan lake for fishing and water supply show high levels of urinary Schistosoma infection.

The postal code of the area is 110.

See also
Abeokuta North constituency

References

Local Government Areas in Ogun State
Local Government Areas in Yorubaland